The 1984 Madrid Grand Prix was a men's tennis tournament played on indoor carpet courts. It was the 13th edition of the tournament and was part of the Super Series of the 1984 Volvo Grand Prix. It was played in Madrid, Spain and was held from 27 February until 4 March 1984. First-seeded John McEnroe won the singles title.

Finals

Singles
 John McEnroe defeated  Tomáš Šmíd 6–0, 6–4
 It was McEnroe's 3rd singles title of the year and the 49th of his career.

Doubles
 Peter Fleming /  John McEnroe defeated  Fritz Buehning /  Ferdi Taygan 6–3, 6–3

References

External links
 ITF tournament edition details

Madrid Tennis Grand Prix
Madrid
Madrid